Sonya Monosoff (born June 11, 1927 in Cleveland, Ohio) is a violinist, a pioneer of the Baroque violin and one of the first American performers to use the Baroque violin in performance.

Biography 
Sonya Monosoff studied the violin with Louis Persinger. She also studied chamber music with Felix Salmond and Hans Letz1. A graduate of the Juilliard School of Music, she joined the Quartet Galimir, refounded by Felix Galimir during his exile in America. In 1963 she founded and directed her own ensemble, first called the Baroque Players of New York (later the Chamber Players), performing a range of works from Henry Purcell to Bulent Ariel.

In its infancy, Monosoff joined the ensemble New York Pro Musica under Noah Greenberg. She was the first modern performer to record the Rosary Sonatas and the 8 Sonatas of 1681 by Heinrich Biber. Her recording of the Bach sonatas with harpsichordist James Weaver won best recording of the year (1963) from Sound_&_Vision_(magazine).

From 1972 to 1997 she taught at Cornell University. In 1974 she formed the Trio Amade (1974-1997) with fortepianist Malcolm Bilson and cellist John Hsu.

Sonya Monosoff has given recitals of chamber Music in the US, Canada, Europe, Israel, Australia, New Zealand and Hong Kong.

After 1991 she taught violin and chamber music and gave concerts outside the United States, including the Czech Republic and where she was at the Prague Spring International Music Festival in 1993. She taught and gave master classes in many American and Canadian universities, and was invited to the Bar-Ilan University in Tel Aviv and Ferrara.

Partial discography
Monosoff's discography is currently lacking in CD format reissues, though LP and tape cassette formats are available at many university libraries. In the vein of Baroque performance, she recorded Biber, Corelli, Geminiani and JS Bach. With piano accompaniment, she made recordings of the violin sonatas of Mozart.

Cornell University also keeps archival recordings of Monosoff's many performances at Barnes Hall. For example, her performance on October 7, 1962 of J.S. Bach's trio sonatas, BWV 1038 and 1079, and her October 29, 1974 performance of Charles Ives' Dialogues for violin and piano (1958) are both available in Cornell's archives.

 1962: Biber Rosary Sonatas - János Scholz, viola da gamba; John Miller, baroque bassoon; Melville Smith, organ and harpsichord (3 LP Records Cambridge CRS 18113 / LP Pleiades Records 2P107)  Performed on instruments from the collection of the Smithsonian Institution (Washington).
 1962: Mozart Violin Sonatas K 379 and K 454 - Lonny Epstein, fortepiano (Cambridge LP Records) 
 1964: Biber, 8 Sonatas for solo violin and continuo (1681) - János Scholz, viola da gamba; Melville Smith, harpsichord (LP Cambridge SRC Records, 1812)
 1967: Vivaldi, The Four Seasons - Sonya Monosoff, Helen Kwalwasser, Nadia Koutzen, solo violins; Eugenia Earle, harpsichord; New York Sinfonietta Dir. Max Goberman (LP Odyssey 32 16 0131) 
 1972: Stephen Foster, Melodies [for Jeannie with the light brown hair and Some folks] - Jan DeGaetani, mezzo-soprano; Leslie Guinn, baritone; Gilbert Kalish, piano and melodeon; Robert Sheldon, flute & keyed bugle; Douglas Koeppe, & piccolo flute; James Weaver, piano; The Camerata Chorus of Washington (LP LP Nonesuch H-71268 / Electra / Nonesuch 9 7915802) . Played on instruments from the collection of the Smithsonian Institution (Washington).
 1973: Corelli, 12 Sonatas, Op. 5 - Judith Davidoff, viola da gamba and cello; James Weaver, harpsichord and organ (3LP Musical Heritage Society MHS 1690/1/2) 
 1976: Haydn, Trios, Hob. xv: 19, 27 and 29 - The Trio Amade: Malcolm Bilson, fortepiano; John Hsu, cello (LP Titanic Records Ti-12)
 1970: Leclair Sonatas for two violins - Sonya Monosoff & Carol Lieberman, baroque violins (LP Titanic Records Ti-45) 
 1977: Mozart Violin Sonata K 304, 376, 380 - Malcolm Bilson, fortepiano (ed Southern Illinois University Press - LP Pleiades Records P 104.) . Performed on a 1692 Stradivarius from the Metropolitan Museum of Art (New York).
 1978: Geminiani, Sonatas II and X, opus 1; Sonatas I and XI, opus 4 - James Weaver, harpsichord; Judith Davidoff, baroque cello (LP Musical Heritage Society) 
 1978: Bach Sonatas for Violin and Harpsichord BWV 1014-1019, 1021, 1023 - James Weaver, harpsichord; Judith Davidoff, viola da gamba (4–12 April 1978 CRS Records 3LP Cambridge 2822B / LP Columbia Special Products P3-14830) . Played on instruments from the collection of the Smithsonian Institution (Washington).

Publications

Articles
 
 
 
 {{cite journal| author1= Sonya Monosoff | title= Violin Fingering [Review 'Violin fingering in the 18th century by Peter Walls] | periodical= Early Music | number= 13 |date=February 1985 | pages= 76–79 | doi=10.1093/earlyj/13.1.76}}
  Grove Music Online,  Articles  Arco (i), Pizzicato, Position, Shift ''.

Collaboration

Bibliography

References

External links
 

1927 births
Living people
Juilliard School alumni
Women classical violinists
21st-century American violinists
21st-century American women musicians